Philips-Thompson Buildings was a set of two historic commercial buildings located at Wilmington, New Castle County, Delaware. They were built about 1884, and were two three-story, red brick buildings.  They had a row of square decorative terra cotta tiles divides the second and third stories. They featured a corbelled brick cornice and sunburst decorations capping the central bays.  The buildings housed a wholesale farm supply company, wholesale grocers and produce shops. The buildings have been demolished.

It was added to the National Register of Historic Places in 1980.

References

External links

Commercial buildings on the National Register of Historic Places in Delaware
Commercial buildings completed in 1884
Buildings and structures in Wilmington, Delaware
Historic American Buildings Survey in Delaware
National Register of Historic Places in Wilmington, Delaware